High-Mobility Group or HMG is a group of chromosomal proteins that are involved in the regulation of DNA-dependent processes such as
transcription, replication, recombination, and DNA repair.

Families
The HMG proteins are subdivided into 3 superfamilies each containing a characteristic functional domain:

 HMGA – contains an AT-hook domain
 HMGA1
 HMGA2
 HMGB – contains a HMG-box domain
 HMGB1
 HMGB2
 HMGB3
 HMGB4
 HMGN – contains a nucleosomal binding domain
 HMGN1
 HMGN2
 HMGN3
 HMGN4
 HMGN5
Proteins containing any of these embedded in their sequence are known as HMG motif proteins. 
HMG-box proteins are found in a variety of eukaryotic organisms.

They were originally isolated from mammalian cells, and named according to their electrophoretic mobility in polyacrylamide gels.

Other families with HMG-box domain
 SOX gene family
 Sex-Determining Region Y Protein
 SOX1, SOX2, etc.
 TCF/LEF family (T cell factor/lymphoid enhancer factor family)
 LEF1 (Lymphoid enhancer-binding factor 1)
 TCF7 (TCF-1)
 TCF7L1 (TCF-3)
 TCF7L2 (TCF-4)

Function
HMG proteins are thought to play a significant role in various human disorders. Disruptions and rearrangements in the genes coding for some of the HMG proteins are associated with some common benign tumors. Antibodies to HMG proteins are found in patients with autoimmune diseases. The SRY gene on the Y Chromosome, responsible for male sexual differentiation, contains an HMG-Box domain.  A member of the HMG family of proteins, HMGB1, has also been shown to have an extracellular activity as a chemokine, attracting neutrophils and mononuclear inflammatory cells to the infected liver. The high-mobility group protein such as HMO1  alters DNA architecture by binding, bending and looping. Furthermore, these HMG-box DNA-binding proteins increase the flexibility of the DNA upon binding.

See also
 Gene regulatory network
 HMG-box
 Transcription factors

References

External links
 HMG nomenclature home page
 

Gene expression
Transcription factors